Wielen is a small village in the district of Grafschaft Bentheim in Lower Saxony, Germany, and belongs to the Joint Community (Samtgemeinde) of Uelsen. Wielen has 614 inhabitants. Within the village is found the Lower County’s oldest maintained school, het Schöltien.

Constituent communities
Along with the namesake Ortsteil, there are outlying centres named Balderhaar, Striepe and Vennebrügge.

References

External links
Wielen
Joint Community’s webpage

County of Bentheim (district)